Mladeč is a municipality and village in Olomouc District in the Olomouc Region of the Czech Republic. It has about 700 inhabitants.

Administrative parts
Villages of Nové Zámky and Sobáčov are administrative parts of Mladeč.

Geography

Northern part of the municipality is located in the Litovelské Pomoraví Protected Landscape Area. The Morava River flows through the rural area of the municipality. The Mlýnský brook, a tributary of the Morava, also flows through the municipality and is divided here into two branches. There are two ponds in the municipal territory: Sobáčovský and Zámecký.

History
The first written mention of Mladeč is from 1350. Sobáčov was first mentioned in 1351.

Sights
Mladeč is known for the Mladeč Caves. The caves are open to the public.

Archaeology
Mladeč is an Aurignacian archaeological site with directly dated remains of early modern human dating to about 31,000 radiocarbon years. The site contains remains of at least half a dozen individuals, including children. They are the oldest bones that indicate a human settlement, or community in Europe. The Mladeč collection also includes Aurignacian tools and art associated with early modern humans. The remains appear to show some Neanderthal-like features.

References

External links

Mladeč Caves official website

Villages in Olomouc District
Aurignacian
Archaeological sites in the Czech Republic